The Hungarian Hope Movement ( (MRM); ,  Pokret Mađarske Nade (PMN)) was a political party organized by some members of the Hungarian minority in Voivodina, Serbia. Party claimed that its aim is to represent the interests for the benefit of all Hungarian people living in the country. Based upon a similar ideological background, it preferred the affiliation with the Movement for a Better Hungary (Jobbik), which is a radical and nationalist party in Hungary. Currently, the Hungarian Hope Movement does not hold any parliamentary seats; neither in the Serbian parliament, nor the Vojvodinian one.

Main Goals
The Hungarian Hope Movement (HHM) was one of the parties of Hungarian minority in Vojvodina. It was formed with the purpose to represent the interests, defend and improve the rights of the Hungarian national community in Serbia. Furthermore, HHP is seeking to link Hungarian minority in Serbia with Hungary and with other Hungarian communities in neighboring countries, but also all around the world linguistically, socially, economically and culturally. With these main goals, the Party would like to develop a bright socio-political future for the Hungarian minority in Serbia and to overturn certain political, demographic, social and economical processes, which are seen as negative by this party.

Main guidelines
The Hungarian Hope Movement (HHM) was a party of Hungarian minority that was formed to represent the short-, mid- and long-term goals which, according to the party, are needed for the development and socio-political survival of the Hungarian community in Vojvodina.
The Party puted those matters in priority which have direct impact on the life of its members and in general, of the Hungarians living in Serbia. Besides summarizing, analyzing and searching resolutions for all the problems of their comrades, the HHP makes their goals and guidelines friendly for every citizen. The most important messages and items of these goals and guidelines are available in an articulate form for everyone. HHM was not just a political party, but a movement of actions, which does not deal only with political activity, but also organizes protests, movements and actions affecting the province and everyday life, reaching evident results.
Understanding, joining, practicing and fighting for these objectives is open for everyone. The party claims that it is important that the present and future members of HHM understand that this party "does not want to be part of the meaningless everyday politics but want to help for the Hungarian minority".

Some main objectives of HHM
•	Defending and supporting the Hungarian minority, establishing autonomy

•	Establishing a full autonomy for Vojvodina

•	Stopping the migration and assimilation of the Hungarian minority in Serbia

•	Strengthening of public safety with the establishment of a multicultural militia

•	Fight against colonization of Vojvodina

•	Analyzing the attacks committed against the national minorities of Vojvodina

•	Clearing up outstanding historical events, reaching remedy for the war crimes that were committed against Hungarians

•	Strengthening the national feelings of Hungarian citizens, showing the cultural values of the Hungarians in Serbia

•	Fraying out Hungarian citizenship for Hungarians abroad with full voting rights

•	Supporting and developing the poor areas where Hungarians live

•	Endorsing equal language use in practice, both in offices and in the streets

•	Sorting out every other questionable task regarding the Hungarian minority

Party positions
The HHM had 1 representative in the House of Representatives of the Autonomous Province of Vojvodina, namely Gyula László. The party has 1 chosen member in the Hungarian National Council and further 3 committee members. They also have a delegate in the Board of Trustees of the Szekeres Laszló Foundation, and numerous delegates in several Boards of the Forum of Hungarian Representatives in the Carpathian-basin.

Participation in elections
In 2012 Vojvodina parliamentary election, the party won 0.59% of votes in the province. Ethnic Hungarians, who comprising 14.28% of population of Vojvodina according to 2002 census, mostly voted for Alliance of Vojvodina Hungarians and Democratic Party.

External links
Official website of HHM
Official YouTube-channel of HHM
About cooperation between Hungarian Hope Movement and Jobbik party (in Serbian)
Infiltration of pro-fascist parties from Hungary into Vojvodina  (in Serbian)

References

Hungarian nationalism
Hungarian political parties in Serbia
Jobbik
Politics of Vojvodina
Nationalist parties in Serbia
Right-wing populism in Hungary
Defunct political parties in Serbia